This article attempts to list the oldest buildings in the state of Rhode Island in the United States of America, including the oldest houses in Rhode Island and any other surviving structures.  Some dates are approximate and based on architectural studies and historical records, other dates are based on dendrochronology All entries should include citation with reference to: architectural features; a report by an architectural historian; or dendrochronology

Very few Rhode Island buildings have been tested yet using dendrochronology (less than a dozen houses as of 2019), and most buildings outside of Aquidneck Island were burned in King Philip's War in the 1670s.  The oldest building in Rhode Island tested using dendrochronology was the Clemence-Irons House (1691) in Johnston, although the Lucas–Johnston House in Newport holds some timbers which were felled prior to 1650, but likely reused from an earlier building.

List

Destroyed early Rhode Island buildings

See also 
 Henry Bull House, c. 1639 possibly oldest house in RI until demolished in 1912)
Oldest buildings in America
 Roger Mowry Tavern, c. 1653 possibly oldest house in RI until demolished in 1900)
 Stone-ender
 Timeline of architectural styles

Notes

External links 
 Clement Weaver House - Oldest House in Rhode Island, (1679) (accessed on June 21, 2008)
 Norman A. Isham & Alber Frederic Brown, Early Rhode Island Houses:, (Preston & Rounds, 1895) (accessed June 21, 2008 on Google Book Search)
 Oldest Houses in South County, (1934) (accessed on June 21, 2008)
 Michael Mello, Providence Journal, "Dating R.I's oldest houses is part science, part art" August 21, 2005

Rhode Island
Oldest buildings